Anyphaena accentuata is a species of spider in the Order Araneae.

Description
The female specimens have a body length that range between 5 and 9 mm, the male specimens are between 4 and 7 mm.

Range
The range spreads from Europe to Central Asia.

Habitat
The species lives in trees, conifers and shrubs. During the day they hide in their woven tubes. During the night they hunt. They can also be found in houses and apartments.

A study conducted in lowland forests in the Czech Republic found that A. accentuata often overwinter in bird nesting boxes. They remain active and, unlike other species, do not build web nests. During warmer seasons, they dwell in bark and tree trunks.

References

Anyphaenidae
Spiders described in 1802
Spiders of Asia
Spiders of Europe